Gupse Özay (born 30 July 1984) is a Turkish actress, scriptwriter and director.

Life and career
Gupse Özay was born in İzmir, Turkey. She is of Circassian descent. She studied at Radio Television and Cinema Department of Ege University. Her role is Nurhayat in Gülse Birsel's hit sitcom Yalan Dünya.

Filmography

Documentary
Yaman Yaşamışım

References

Living people
1984 births
Turkish film actresses
Turkish television actresses
People from İzmir
Turkish people of Circassian descent